St. Mary Magdalene's Church is a Roman Catholic church in Riga, the capital of Latvia. The church is situated at the addresses 4 Klostera Street and 2 Mazaja Pils Street.

The church is named for Jesus' companion, Mary Magdalene.

References

External links 
 

Roman Catholic churches in Riga
Roman Catholic churches in Latvia